Ocotea foetens, commonly called til or stinkwood is a species of tree in the family Lauraceae. It is evergreen and grows up to 40 m tall. It is a common constituent of the laurisilva forests of Madeira and the Canary Islands. Leaf fossils of this species are known from the Mio-Pleistocene of Madeira Island.

Description 

Ocotea foetens is endemic to Macaronesia. Like the other species of the genus Ocotea, it is rich in essential oils, which give an unpleasant odor to the wood when freshly cut (hence the name foetens, Latin for smelly, stinky, disgusting, unpleasant). It is rarely used as an ornamental. It commonly grows with multiple trunks branched from the base. The bark is rough and irregular, and dark in colour; the young branches are angular, with smooth bark, sometimes reddish in areas of recent growth. The wood is dark and hard.

In adult plants, the leaves are leathery in texture, glossy on both sides, darker green on the upper surface, with 2(-4) small gland-like depressions on the underside near the base.

The flowers of both sexes are white, with splashes of green and pale yellow, releasing a slight odor. The perianth has six components, and there are nine stamens. The predominant flowering season is from June to August (northern hemisphere).

The fruit is dark green, gradually darkening with maturity. The fruit has a single seed wrapped in a hard coat. When the fruits fall they separate from the dome. Germination is favored by moisture and light.

Ecology
Ocotea foetens is endemic to Madeira and the Canary Islands, appearing in laurel forest habitat, generally between 400 and 1400 m altitude. In the Canary Islands it is not present on Lanzarote or Fuerteventura. In the archipelago of Madeira it is absent from Porto Santo. In the Azores Islands it is an introduced species. It is the only Paleoendemic Ocotea species in the wetter relict forest areas of Macaronesia. Its berries are consumed mostly by the endemic Madeiran pigeon Columba trocaz.

Folklore
Ocotea foetens was sacred to the Bimbaches, the older inhabitants of El Hierro in the Canary Islands, and was one of their symbols. The legend states that the "Garoé" was a large laurel tree that assured the life of the Bimbaches, providing them with water in sufficient amounts for their survival. The islands are located where tradewinds occur, and water from clouds condensed on the branches of the tree and it later poured rain around the tree. One of many legends says that the water originating from the tree was led to a hole from which the Bimbaches could provide water.

The original tree fell in a storm in 1610. In 1957, a replacement was planted in the same location as the Garoé.  It has been growing and is surrounded by mosses.

References

 

foetens
Flora of the Azores
Flora of the Canary Islands
Flora of Madeira
Endemic flora of Macaronesia
Trees of Mediterranean climate
Trees in religion
Taxonomy articles created by Polbot
Taxa named by William Aiton